K-1 PREMIUM 2007 Dynamite!! was an annual kickboxing and mixed martial arts event held by K-1 and Hero's on New Year's Eve, Monday December 31, 2007 at the Kyocera Dome Osaka in Osaka, Japan. It featured 7 HERO'S MMA rules fights, 4 K-1 rules fights, and 4 fights in the K-1 Under 18 Tournament.

The event attracted a sellout crowd of 47,918 to the Kyocera Dome Osaka, and was broadcast live across Japan on the TBS Network.

A fight between Sergei Kharitonov and Mighty Mo was scheduled to take place, but Mo was forced to withdraw due to leg injuries incurred during his last fight in K-1.

Results

See also
List of K-1 events
List of male kickboxers
Yarennoka!

References

External links
K-1 Dynamite!! Official Site
K-1 Official Website

K-1 events
Hero's events
2007 in kickboxing
2007 in mixed martial arts
Kickboxing in Japan
Mixed martial arts in Japan
Sport in Osaka